The Former Central Government Offices (also the Government Headquarters), now called Justice Place, is an office building complex that formerly housed most of the major offices of the Hong Kong Government. The complex is located in Central, Hong Kong, occupying the lower level of Government Hill. The offices of the government have been relocated to the Main Block of the Central Government Complex, Tamar.

History 
Completed in 1957 by the Government of Hong Kong, it replaced a two-storey colonial complex from the 1930s, the old Secretariat Building (built in 1847 and demolished in 1954).

Like Hong Kong City Hall, the complex was built in the International style.

Legislative Council 
The Legislative Council of Hong Kong met here until 1985, when it moved to the old Supreme Court Building.

Government offices 
All major government departments except the Department of Justice are now located at the Central Government Complex in Tamar. The Department of Justice remained at the former Central Government Offices Main and East Wing, which was renamed Justice Place.

Former home

 Main Wing (18 Lower Albert Road) – 8 floors and Annex
 East Wing (20 Lower Albert Road)
 West Wing (11 Ice House Street) – 7-13 floors

The most familiar wing was the Main Wing, housing offices of the Chief Executive and site of most major protests against the Hong Kong Government (another site is the LegCo). In order to keep protesters who have not applied from entering the complex, a series of fences was erected in 1998 after the transfer of sovereignty of Hong Kong to the People's Republic of China in 1997.

Plans are under way to replace the current buildings with a new  office at the Tamar basin and scheduled to be completed by 2010. Apart from government offices, the Tamar site will also house the Legislative Council and provide not less than 22,000 square metres of open space for public enjoyment. The cost for developing the entire Tamar site is estimated at HKD5.2 billion.

Plans after 2011 will likely see the Justice Department re-locate to the Main and East Wings. The government has proposed to demolish the West Wing while community groups are proposing to protect the historic site.

List of tenants of the three complexes:

 West Wing
 Civil Service Bureau
 Financial Services and the Treasury Bureau
 Economic Development Bureau
 Housing, Planning and Lands Bureau
 Main Wing
 Constitutional Affairs Bureau
 Security Bureau
 Chief Executive
 East Wing
 Security Bureau

See also 

 Central Government Complex, Tamar
 Government Secretariat (Hong Kong)
 Legislative Council Building

References 

 Sing Pao Star Daily, 23 October 2005 No 176, p 50-52

External links 

 Old Secretariat Building
 Central Government Offices, Historic and Architectural Appraisal , 2009
 "Our Government Hill"
 Public Views Invited on the Proposed Gradings of the Post 1950 Former Central Government Offices, Plans and Photos, Reference materials

Central, Hong Kong
Government buildings completed in 1957
Government buildings in Hong Kong
Government Hill
Landmarks in Hong Kong
Hong Kong - Central Government Offices
Grade I historic buildings in Hong Kong